José Guillermo Aréchiga Santamaría (born 2 September 1958) is a Mexican independent politician (formerly affiliated with the Institutional Revolutionary Party). As of 2014 he served as Deputy of the LIX Legislature of the Mexican Congress representing Puebla.

References

1958 births
Living people
People from Puebla (city)
Institutional Revolutionary Party politicians
Politicians from Puebla
Monterrey Institute of Technology and Higher Education alumni
21st-century Mexican politicians
Deputies of the LIX Legislature of Mexico
Members of the Chamber of Deputies (Mexico) for Puebla